Harry Louis Schwartz (October 11, 1906 – March 6, 1970) was an American college football player.

University of North Carolina
He was a prominent center for the North Carolina Tar Heels of the University of North Carolina, captain of the 1928 team.  He was a native of Charlotte. '28 was a rough year, opening with a 65 to 0 defeat of Wake Forest. One account going into a game against Harvard reads "The team is built around its captain and center, Harry Schwartz, almost universally chosen as all Southern center in 1927. This is Schwartz's third year in intercollegiate competition and his wealth of experience combined with natural leadership abilities will go a long way towards keeping the team together as a fighting unit." Schwartz twice received All-Southern honors. Fuzzy Woodruff once wrote, "Schwartz is beyond any question or cavil the best defensive center in the South. He makes as many tackles on the ends as the ends or halfbacks. He is everywhere. He wears a moustache and it doesn't hurt him. Apparently he never gets tired. He's everything that a good footballer is expected to be." At UNC Schwartz was a member of the first Jewish fraternity on the North Carolina campus, Tau Epsilon Phi.

References

External links

1906 births
1970 deaths
American football centers
All-Southern college football players
North Carolina Tar Heels football players
Players of American football from Charlotte, North Carolina
Jewish American sportspeople
20th-century American Jews